Centaurea phrygia, commonly called wig knapweed, is a species of Centaurea. It is native to Europe.

References 

phrygia
Plants described in 1753
Taxa named by Carl Linnaeus